Bermudaconus is a subgenus  of sea snails, cone snails, marine gastropod mollusks in the genus Conus,  family Conidae, the cone snails and their allies.

In the new classification of the family Conidae by Puillandre N., Duda T.F., Meyer C., Olivera B.M. & Bouchet P. (2015), Bermudaconus has become a subgenus of Conus: Conus (Bermudaconus) Petuch, 2013  represented as Conus Thiele, 1929

Species list
This list of species is based on the information in the WoRMS list. Species within the genus Bermudaconus include:
 Bermudaconus lightbourni (Petuch, 1986): synonym of Conus (Bermudaconus) lightbourni Petuch, 1986 represented as Conus lightbourni Petuch, 1986

References

 Petuch E. (2013) Biogeography and biodiversity of western Atlantic mollusks. CRC Press. 252 pp.

External links
 Puillandre N., Duda T.F., Meyer C., Olivera B.M. & Bouchet P. (2015). One, four or 100 genera? A new classification of the cone snails. Journal of Molluscan Studies. 81: 1-23

Conidae
Gastropod subgenera